Uncial 0128 (in the Gregory-Aland numbering), ε 071 (Soden), is a Greek uncial manuscript of the New Testament, dated paleographically to the 9th-century.

Description 

The codex contains a small part of the Matthew 25:32-37.40-42.44-45, on one parchment leaf (35 cm by 25.5 cm). The text is written in two columns per page, 33 lines per page, in uncial letters.
It uses accents; it has itacistic errors.

The Greek text of this codex is a representative of the mixed text-type. Aland placed it in Category III.

It is dated by the INTF to the 9th-century.

Formerly it was designated by Tr. In 1908 Gregory gave number 0128 to it.

The codex is located now at the Bibliothèque nationale de France (Copt. 129,10 f. 208) in Paris.

See also 

 List of New Testament uncials
 Textual criticism
 Uncial 0127

References

Further reading 

 Hermann von Soden, "Die Schriften des Neuen Testaments, in ihrer ältesten erreichbaren Textgestalt hergestellt auf Grund ihrer Textgeschichte", Verlag von Arthur Glaue, Berlin 1902-1910, p. 72. 
 E. Amélineau, Notice des manuscrits coptes de la Bibliothèque Nationale (Paris: 1985), pp. 409–410.

Greek New Testament uncials
9th-century biblical manuscripts
Bibliothèque nationale de France collections